This list shows the IUCN Red List status of the 81 mammal species occurring in Austria. One of them is endangered, five are vulnerable, and three are near threatened.
The following tags are used to highlight each species' status as assessed on the respective IUCN Red List published by the International Union for Conservation of Nature:

Order: Rodentia (rodents) 

Rodents make up the largest order of mammals, with over 40% of mammalian species. They have two incisors in the upper and lower jaw which grow continually and must be kept short by gnawing.

Suborder: Sciurognathi
Family: Sciuridae (squirrels)
Subfamily: Sciurinae
Genus: Sciurus
 Red squirrel, S. vulgaris 
Subfamily: Xerinae
Genus: Marmota
 Alpine marmot, M. marmota 
Genus: Spermophilus
 European ground squirrel, S. citellus VU
Family: Gliridae (dormice)
Subfamily: Leithiinae
Genus: Dryomys
 Forest dormouse, Dryomys nitedula LC
Genus: Eliomys
 Garden dormouse, E. quercinus 
Genus: Muscardinus
 Hazel dormouse, Muscardinus avellanarius LC
Subfamily: Glirinae
Genus: Glis
 European edible dormouse, Glis glis LC
Family: Dipodidae (jerboas)
Subfamily: Sicistinae
Genus: Sicista
 Northern birch mouse, Sicista betulina LC
 Southern birch mouse, Sicista subtilis LC
Family: Cricetidae
Subfamily: Cricetinae
Genus: Cricetus
European hamster, C. cricetus 
Subfamily: Arvicolinae
Genus: Arvicola
 European water vole, A. amphibius 
Genus: Chionomys
 Snow vole, Chionomys nivalis LC
Genus: Clethrionomys
 Bank vole, Clethrionomys glareolus LC
Genus: Microtus
 Field vole, Microtus agrestis LC
 Common vole, Microtus arvalis LC
 Bavarian pine vole, Microtus bavaricus 
 Alpine pine vole, Microtus multiplex LC
 Tundra vole, Microtus oeconomus LC
 European pine vole, Microtus subterraneus LC
Family: Muridae (mice, rats, voles, gerbils, hamsters, etc.)
Subfamily: Murinae
Genus: Apodemus
 Striped field mouse, Apodemus agrarius LC
 Alpine field mouse, Apodemus alpicola LC
 Yellow-necked mouse, Apodemus flavicollis LC
 Ural field mouse, Apodemus uralensis LC
Genus: Micromys
 Eurasian harvest mouse, Micromys minutus LC
Genus: Mus
 Steppe mouse, Mus spicilegus LC

Order: Lagomorpha (lagomorphs) 

The lagomorphs comprise two families, Leporidae (hares and rabbits), and Ochotonidae (pikas). Though they can resemble rodents, and were classified as a superfamily in that order until the early 20th century, they have since been considered a separate order. They differ from rodents in a number of physical characteristics, such as having four incisors in the upper jaw rather than two.
Family: Leporidae (rabbits, hares)
Genus: Lepus
European hare, L. europaeus 
Mountain hare, L. timidus 
Genus: Oryctolagus
European rabbit, O. cuniculus  introduced

Order: Erinaceomorpha (hedgehogs and gymnures) 

The order Erinaceomorpha contains a single family, Erinaceidae, which comprise the hedgehogs and gymnures. The hedgehogs are easily recognised by their spines while gymnures look more like large rats.

Family: Erinaceidae (hedgehogs)
Subfamily: Erinaceinae
Genus: Erinaceus
West European hedgehog, E. europaeus

Order: Soricomorpha (shrews, moles, and solenodons) 

The "shrew-forms" are insectivorous mammals. The shrews and solenodons closely resemble mice while the moles are stout-bodied burrowers.
Family: Soricidae (shrews)
Subfamily: Crocidurinae
Genus: Crocidura
 Bicolored shrew, C. leucodon 
 Greater white-toothed shrew, C. russula 
Lesser white-toothed shrew, C. suaveolens 
Subfamily: Soricinae
Tribe: Nectogalini
Genus: Neomys
 Southern water shrew, N. anomalus 
 Eurasian water shrew, N. fodiens 
Tribe: Soricini
Genus: Sorex
 Alpine shrew, S. alpinus 
 Common shrew, S. araneus 
 Crowned shrew, S. coronatus 
 Eurasian pygmy shrew, S. minutus 
Family: Talpidae (moles)
Subfamily: Talpinae
Tribe: Talpini
Genus: Talpa
 European mole, T. europaea

Order: Chiroptera (bats) 

The bats' most distinguishing feature is that their forelimbs are developed as wings, making them the only mammals capable of flight. Bat species account for about 20% of all mammals.
Family: Vespertilionidae
Subfamily: Myotinae
Genus: Myotis
Bechstein's bat, M. bechsteini 
Greater mouse-eared bat, M. myotis 
Lesser mouse-eared bat, M. blythii 
Brandt's bat, M. brandti 
 Daubenton's bat, M. daubentonii 
Geoffroy's bat, M. emarginatus 
Whiskered bat, M. mystacinus 
Natterer's bat, M. nattereri 
Subfamily: Vespertilioninae
Genus: Barbastella
Western barbastelle, B. barbastellus 
Genus: Eptesicus
 Northern bat, E. nilssoni LC
Serotine bat, E. serotinus 
Genus: Nyctalus
Lesser noctule, N. leisleri 
Common noctule, N. noctula 
Genus: Pipistrellus
 Nathusius' pipistrelle, P. nathusii 
 Kuhl's pipistrelle, P. kuhlii LC
 Common pipistrelle, P. pipistrellus LC
 Pygmy pipistrelle, P. pygmaeus
Genus: Hypsugo
 Savi's pipistrelle, H. savii 
Genus: Plecotus
Brown long-eared bat, P. auritus 
Grey long-eared bat, P. austriacus 
Family: Molossidae
Genus: Tadarida
 European free-tailed bat, T. teniotis LC
Family: Rhinolophidae
Subfamily: Rhinolophinae
Genus: Rhinolophus
Blasius's horseshoe bat, R. blasii 
Greater horseshoe bat, R. ferrumequinum 
Lesser horseshoe bat, R. hipposideros

Order: Carnivora (carnivorans) 

There are over 260 species of carnivorans, the majority of which feed primarily on meat. They have a characteristic skull shape and dentition.
Family: Felidae (cats)
Subfamily: Felinae
Genus: Felis
 European wildcat, F. silvestris 
Genus: Lynx
 Eurasian lynx, L. lynx 

Family: Canidae (dogs, foxes)
Genus: Vulpes
 Red fox, V. vulpes 
Genus: Canis
Golden jackal, C. aureus 
 European jackal, C. a. moreoticus
 Gray wolf, C. lupus 
 Eurasian wolf, C. l. lupus
Family: Ursidae (bears)
Genus: Ursus
 Brown bear, U. arctos  presence uncertain
 Eurasian brown bear, U. a. arctos presence uncertain
Family: Mustelidae (mustelids)
Genus: Lutra
Eurasian otter, L. lutra 
Genus: Martes
Beech marten, M. foina 
European pine marten, M. martes 
Genus: Meles
 European badger, M. meles 
Genus: Mustela
Stoat, M. erminea 
Least weasel, M. nivalis 
European polecat, M. putorius 
Genus: Neogale
American mink, N. vison  introduced

Order: Artiodactyla (even-toed ungulates) 

The even-toed ungulates are ungulates whose weight is borne about equally by the third and fourth toes, rather than mostly or entirely by the third as in perissodactyls. There are about 220 artiodactyl species, including many that are of great economic importance to humans.
Family: Cervidae (deer)
Subfamily: Cervinae
Genus: Cervus
Red deer, C. elaphus 
Genus: Dama
 European fallow deer, D. dama LC introduced
Subfamily: Capreolinae
Genus: Capreolus
Roe deer, C. capreolus 
Family: Bovidae (cattle, antelope, sheep, goats)
Subfamily: Caprinae
Genus: Capra
Alpine ibex, C. ibex  reintroduced 
Genus: Rupicapra
Chamois, R. rupicapra 
Family: Suidae (pigs)
Subfamily: Suinae
Genus: Sus
Wild boar, S. scrofa

Locally extinct 
The following species are locally extinct in the country:
 Moose, Alces alces
 European bison, Bison bonasus
Common bent-wing bat, Miniopterus schreibersii possibly extirpated
 European mink, Mustela lutreola

See also
List of chordate orders
Lists of mammals by region
List of prehistoric mammals
Mammal classification
List of mammals described in the 2000s

References

External links

Austria
Mammals
Mammals
Austria